Kessel is a railway station in Kessel, Antwerp, Belgium. The station opened in 1894 on the Line 15.

Train services
The following services currently the serve the station:

Intercity services (IC-30) Antwerp - Herentals - Turnhout (weekends)
Local services (L-24) Antwerp - Herentals - Mol (weekdays)

Bus services
Bus service 3 serves the Toerenvenstraat, north of the station, service 154 calls at the station. They are operated by De Lijn.

3 (Lier - Kessel-Station - Emblem)
154 (Lier - Kessel-Station)

Gallery

References

Railway stations opened in 1894
Railway stations in Belgium
Railway stations in Antwerp Province